Lee Byung-heon is a Professor of Biochemistry and Cell Biology in the School of Medicine at Kyungpook National University (KNU), South Korea. He received his M.D. license from Korean Medical Association in 1989. He received his B.S. from the School of Medicine, KNU in 1989, and his M.S. and Ph.D. in Biochemistry from KNU in 1991 and 1995. He was an Assistant Professor in School of Medicine at Dongguk University in 1996-2001 and a Visiting Investigator in the Sanford-Burnham Medical Research Institute, La Jolla, United States in 2001-2003. He joined KNU in 2003. He is currently a member of Korean Society for Biochemistry and Molecular Biology, the American Association for Cancer Research, and the American Society of Molecular Imaging. His main research interest is “discovery of tissue-specific homing peptides using phage display and their applications to molecular imaging and targeted therapy”. He is currently carrying out projects for the identification of homing peptides to tumor and atherosclerotic plaque and of phosphatidylserine- and blood clotting factor XIIIa-specific peptide ligands. He has published over 30 peer-reviewed papers, book chapters, and review articles. He has also filed several patents.

Academic career
March 1989 – February 1993: Teaching Assistant, Department of Biochemistry, School of Medicine, KNU, South Korea
May 1993 – April 1996: Primary Physician, Public Health Center of Changyeong-gun, Gyeongju, South Korea 
March 1996 – February 1998: Instructor, Department of Biochemistry, School of Medicine, Dongguk University, Gyeongju, South Korea 
June 1997 – August 1997: Visiting Investigator, MD Anderson Cancer Center, Houston, Texas, United States
October 1998 – February 2002: Assistant Professor, Department of Biochemistry, School of Medicine, Dongguk University, Gyeongju, South Korea
February 2001 – July 2003: Visiting Investigator, The Burnham Institute for Medical Research, San Diego, United States
August 2003 – present: Professor Dept of Biochemistry and Cell Biology, School of Medicine, KNU, South Korea; Associate Dean for Research & International Programs, School of Medicine, KNU, South Korea

Professional memberships
1989–present: Korean Society of Molecular Biology and Biochemistry 
1990–present: Korean Society of Molecular Cell Biology 
2003–present: American Association for Cancer Research 
2005–present: American Society of Molecular Imaging

Research interests
Phage display selection of tissue-specific homing peptides and biomarker-sensing peptides:
Phage peptide display is a powerful tool for identifying peptides that selectively bind to a target protein or cells (see figure below). Using this technology, our lab has identified diverse homing peptides, including the bladder tumor-targeting peptide, atherosclerotic plaque-homing peptide, and IL-4 receptor-binding peptide. We also have been working on selecting peptides that specifically recognize or sense biomarker proteins of cardiovascular diseases and cancers.

Recent publications

Patents
 Peptides for targeting apoptotic cells and uses thereof     
 Polypeptide specifically bound to phosphatidylserine and the use thereof     
 Peptide for diagnosing, preventing and treating atherosclerosis and uses thereof   
 Bladder tumor-targeting peptide and use thereof  
 Use of a peptide that interacts with alphaV beta3 integrin of endothelial cells  
 Novel use of isolated polypeptide comprising four FAS-1 domains, EM1 domain and RGD motif  
 Target-aiming drug delivery system for diagnosis and treatment of cancer containing liposome labeled with peptides which specifically targets interleukin-4 receptors, and manufacturing method thereof    
 Peptide which passes through blood-brain barrier and targets apoptosis of neurodegenerative brain disease site and uses thereof    
 Uses of apoptotic cell-targeting peptides, label substances and liposomes containing a therapeutic agent for preventing, treating or therapeutically diagnosing apoptosis-related diseases 
Stroke-targeting peptide and use thereof

Current lab members 
 Gowri Rangaswamy Gunassekaran: Post-doctoral fellow (from India)
 Guruprasath Padmanaban : PhD student (from India)
 Jung Hyun-Kyung (정현경): PhD student (from South Korea)
 Chi Lianhua : PhD student (from China)
 Sri Murugan Poongkavithai Vadevod: PhD student (from India)
 Md. Enamul Haque: PhD student (from Bangladesh)
 Fatima Khan: PhD student (from India)
 Smirti Gurung: PhD student (from India)
 Lee Ji-young (이지영): lab manager

Past lab members
 Sangeetha Purushotham: Post-doctoral fellow (from India)
 Bodhraj Acharya: post-doctoral fellow (from Nepal)
 Kai Wang: post-doctoral fellow (from China)
 Jung Jae-Yeop (정재엽): Master's student (from South Korea)
 Jung Joo-Hee (정주희): Master's student (from South Korea)
 Jung Yu-Min (정유민):Master's student (from South Korea)

References

Living people
Academic staff of Kyungpook National University
Kyungpook National University alumni
20th-century South Korean scientists
21st-century South Korean scientists
Year of birth missing (living people)
South Korean biochemists